The 616th Operations Center (616 OC) is an active unit of the United States Air Force, assigned to the Sixteenth Air Force. It is stationed at Joint Base San Antonio, Texas. It was activated on 16 March 2020 to replace the 624th Operations Center and the 625th Operations Center which were inactivated the same day. The 616th coordinates the operations of 178 units worldwide, with capabilities including cyber warfare, electronic warfare, intelligence, surveillance and reconnaissance (ISR), and weather.

Lineage
 Activated as the 616th Operations Center on 16 March 2020

Assignments
 Sixteenth Air Force, 16 March 2020 – present

Components 
 616th Air Communications Squadron, unknown – present

Stations
 Joint Base San Antonio, Texas, 16 March 2020 – present

References 

Centers of the United States Air Force